Taconic Biosciences is a private biotechnology company specializing in genetically engineered mouse and rat models, microbiome, immuno-oncology mouse models, and integrated model design and breeding services. The company was founded in 1952 as Taconic Farms. The company has three service laboratories and six breeding facilities in the U.S. and Europe, and is headquartered in Rensselaer, New York.

Company overview 
Taconic Biosciences is a breeder and supplier of laboratory animals operating in over 50 countries. The current CEO is Nancy J. Sandy. As of 2016, the company has over 800 employees and 1300 customers.

They produce selectively bred and genetically engineered mice and rats for research use.

History  
 1949 – Robert Phelan began shipping mice from his garage in Canajoharie, NY.
 1952 – Taconic Farms is officially founded in Germantown, NY.
 1955 – Robert dies, leaving the company to his wife, Sally, and sons, Joseph, Richard, and Samuel.
 1963 – Contracted to provide BDF1 mice for the National Cancer Institute.
 1969 – Began offering rats, including Sprague Dawley, one of the most popular breeds of laboratory rat
 1969 – Taconic was the first breeder to receive full accreditation from the American Association for the Accreditation of Laboratory Animals 
 1970 – Contracted to provide the National Institutes of Health with Sprague Dawley rats. They continue to supply NCI with BDF1 mice.
 1975 – Began offering the SHR hypertensive rat and the WKY control strain.
 1980 – Taconic developed the first Isolated Barrier Unit system, a method of housing rodents in a pathogen-free environment. 
 1982 – Began offering Fischer 344 rats and asthmatic rats from Merck-Frost, Montreal, to the product offerings. 
 1985 – Contracted to supply MPF and germ-free animals for the NASA space shuttle missions. 
 1985 – Started producing BALB/c mice. 
 1991 – Became the first commercial provider of the C.B-17 SCID mouse model. 
 1994 – Contracted with National Institute for Allergy and Infectious Disease to maintain a repository of inbred, congenic, and transgenic mice. 
 2002 – Expanded business to Europe
 2014 – Name changed from Taconic Farms to Taconic Biosciences
 2019 – Acquired by H.I.G. Capital

Acquisitions 
In 2001, the company announced it acquired Anmed Laboratories.

In 2002, Taconic announced it acquired M&B Breeding (Denmark).

In December 2009, the company announced it acquired Xenogen Biosciences.

References 

Biotechnology companies of the United States